Southern Border is a 1998 historical drama film directed by Gerardo Herrero. The music was composed by Luis Bacalov. Set in Argentina, the plot follows Roque, forced to emigrate after killing a man in Spain.

Cast

Release 
The film was theatrically released in Spain on 9 October 1998.

Reception 
Jonathan Holland of Variety considered that despite boasting "an epic tale of love and friendship in turn-of-the-century Buenos Aires", "a sexy cast in period costumes" and "sumptuous music and neat special effects", the only thing neglected by Herrero is the script.

See also 
 List of Spanish films of 1998

References

External links
 

1998 films
1990s Spanish-language films
1998 romantic drama films
Argentine romantic drama films
Spanish romantic drama films
German romantic drama films
French romantic drama films
1990s Argentine films
1990s Spanish films
1990s French films
1990s German films
Films directed by Gerardo Herrero
Films about immigration to Argentina
Films set in Argentina